MINOS+ was a continuation of the MINOS experiment (Main injector neutrino oscillation search) to measure neutrino oscillation with improved electronics. It started taking data in 2013 and ran for 3 years.  The experiment has ended and a 6-month dismantling project began in early October 2016.

Physics Goals  
Measure sin22θ and Δm2 with higher precision.
Measure sin22 and Δ2 with higher precision.
Study high energy neutrinos
Search for sterile neutrinos
Search for tau neutrinos
Non-standard interactions
Measurement of the neutrino time of flight
Search for extra dimensions
Atmospheric neutrinos

Neutrino Beam
MINOS+ uses the NuMI beamline generated at Fermilab.  To produce the beamline, 120 GeV proton pulses from the Main Injector hit a water-cooled graphite target. The resulting interactions of protons with the target material produce pions and kaons, which are focused by a system of magnetic horns. These then travel down a long decay tunnel, and their decay produces a neutrino beam parallel to the meson beam.  Most of these are muon neutrinos, with a small electron neutrino contamination. Neutrino interactions in the near detector are used to measure the initial neutrino flux and energy spectrum. Because they are weakly interacting and therefore usually pass through matter, the vast majority of the neutrinos travel through the near detector and the 734 km of rock, then through the far detector and off into space. For the initial 3-year run the NuMI beam will be in its medium energy configuration which will deliver the majority of neutrinos with an energy between 4 GeV and 10 GeV.

Relationship with NOνA
NOνA sits 14 milliradians off the central line of the NuMI beam. At this angle, there is an enhancement of neutrinos with an energy of 2 GeV, at which the L/E (baseline divided by energy) maximizes the oscillation of muon neutrinos. This causes a problem in that the signal you are looking for is a dip in a peak.  MINOS+ sits on the central line of the beam so the full beam make up is seen, thus helping control systematic errors for the NuMI beam energy.

References

External Links 
 MINOS+ experiment record on INSPIRE-HEP

Accelerator neutrino experiments
Fermilab
Particle experiments
Neutrino experiments
Fermilab experiments